Janów Podlaski is a town in Biała Podlaska County, Lublin Voivodeship, in eastern Poland, close to the border with Belarus. It is the seat of the gmina (administrative district) called Gmina Janów Podlaski.
The town has a population of 2700.

Football Team is called Janowia Janów Podlaski.

The state stud farm, also called Janów Podlaski, or simply Janów, was a world-renowned horse breeding establishment that specializes in the purebred Arabian horse.

References

Villages in Biała Podlaska County
Siedlce Governorate
Kholm Governorate
Lublin Voivodeship (1919–1939)